Ans railway station is a railway station in the Belgian municipality of Ans, Liège Province, in Belgium's Wallonia region. It is served by Belgian railway line 36.

Facilities 
The station has five platforms.

Train services
The station is served by the following services:

Intercity services (IC-14) Quiévrain - Mons - Braine-le-Comte - Brussels - Leuven - Liege (weekdays)
Local services (L-21) Waremme - Liege (weekdays)
Local services (L-21) Landen - Waremme - Liege (weekends)

References

Railway stations in Belgium
Railway stations in Liège Province
Ans, Belgium
Railway stations in Belgium opened in 1838